Fabio Boccanera (born 28 October 1964) is an Italian voice actor.

Biography
Born in Rome, Boccanera began his dubbing career at four years of age. He was the Italian voice of a young Thumper in the 1968 redub of Bambi. Boccanera is currently well known as the Italian dubbed voice of Johnny Depp. He also dubbed Colin Farrell and Ben Affleck in some of their films, as well as Christian Bale, Clive Owen, Billy Zane, Joaquin Phoenix and James Marsters.

Boccanera is also known for dubbing characters from many anime productions. He is the younger brother of voice actress Laura Boccanera and the cousin of voice actors Massimo, Emanuela and Riccardo Rossi.

Dubbing roles

Animation
Little Creek in Spirit: Stallion of the Cimarron
Mozenrath in Aladdin
Balto in Balto
Sherlock Gnomes in Sherlock Gnomes
Ronin in Epic
Captain Planet in Captain Planet and the Planeteers
Sitka in Brother Bear
Victor Van Dort in Corpse Bride
Prince Sancho in El Cid: The Legend
Shockblast in Transformers: Energon
Whitney Doubleday in Big Top Scooby-Doo!
 Sterling Archer in Archer
Narrator in ChalkZone

Live action
Jack Sparrow in Pirates of the Caribbean: The Curse of the Black Pearl
Jack Sparrow in Pirates of the Caribbean: Dead Man's Chest
Jack Sparrow in Pirates of the Caribbean: At World's End
Jack Sparrow in Pirates of the Caribbean: On Stranger Tides
Jack Sparrow in Pirates of the Caribbean: Dead Men Tell No Tales
John Dillinger in Public Enemies
Willy Wonka in Charlie and the Chocolate Factory
Sweeney Todd in Sweeney Todd: The Demon Barber of Fleet Street
Cesar in The Man Who Cried
Tony's First Transformation in The Imaginarium of Doctor Parnassus
Caledon Hockley in Titanic
Roman Pearce in Fast Five
Roman Pearce in Fast & Furious 6
Roman Pearce in Furious 7
Roman Pearce in The Fate of the Furious
Bobby Morrow in A Home at the End of the World
David in The Lobster
Huckleberry Finn in The New Adventures of Huckleberry Finn
Spike in Buffy the Vampire Slayer
Spike in Angel
Michael Samuelle in La Femme Nikita
Frederick Abberline in From Hell
Travers Robert Goff in Saving Mr. Banks

Video games
Jack Sparrow in Pirates of the Caribbean: The Legend of Jack Sparrow

References

External links
 
 
 

1964 births
Living people
Italian male voice actors
Male actors from Rome